The Penang betta (Betta pugnax) is a species of gourami native to Southeast Asia and common in swiftly flowing forest streams of the Malay Peninsula, Thailand, Sumatra, and the Riau Islands. In addition to its native range, the species has been introduced to Guam.  It can be found amongst the vegetation growing along the banks.  This species can reach a length of  SL.  It is one of the mouthbrooding Betta species. 
This species, as a natural predator of mosquito larvae, has found use in mosquito control efforts.
Prior to its being eclipsed in Western public recognition by the mass-imported B. splendens (the Siamese fighting fish), B. pugnax was well known as a fighting fish, as denoted by the specific epithet of pugnax, attracting the interest of scientists studying animal behaviour at least as long ago as the 1880s.

References

External links
 Betta Fish Asia: Betta Pugnax (Forest Betta
 Penang Betta - FishTankBank.

Penang betta
Freshwater fish of Southeast Asia
Fish of Thailand
Freshwater fish of Indonesia
Freshwater fish of Malaysia
Fauna of Sumatra
Fish described in 1894
Taxa named by Theodore Edward Cantor

ms:Ikan Sempilai